Zombieactionhauptquartier ("Zombie Action Headquarters") is the second studio album by German metalcore band Callejon.

Track listing

References

External links 
 
 Zombieactionhauptquartier at Callejon's official website

2008 albums
Callejon (band) albums